Red Sandstone may refer to:

Sandstone appearing red due to the inclusion of iron oxides (hematite)
Old Red Sandstone, a British lithostratigraphic unit (a sequence of rock strata) to which stratigraphers accord supergroup status
New Red Sandstone, a chiefly British geological term for the beds of red sandstone and associated rocks laid down throughout the Permian to the end of the Triassic
Red Sandstone Varied Productions, Irish performance art company

See also
Redstone (disambiguation)
Ultisols